The Erpingham Camp (1966) is a 52-minute television play by Joe Orton, which was later performed on stage.

The play was originally produced by Associated-Rediffusion for inclusion in the Seven Deadly Sins series, representing pride. Directed by James Ormerod, it was broadcast on 27 June 1966. Originally made in monochrome on videotape, it survives as a 16mm film telerecording.

Orton subsequently contributed scripts for The Good and Faithful Servant and Funeral Games to the sequel Seven Deadly Virtues series - as faith and pride - but only Servant was actually included.

The Erpingham Camp was first performed on stage in June 1967, as part of a double bill with The Ruffian on the Stair titled Crimes of Passion at the Royal Court Theatre, in a production by Peter Gill. It has been staged on occasion ever since.

Plot

It is a farce in which a respectable group of English campers are innocently enjoying themselves at a 1960s holiday camp before catastrophe strikes and they find themselves fighting against the camp's demonic, rigid, moral and patronising manager, "Erpingham". The play is loosely based on The Bacchae by Euripides.

Original cast

Reginald Marsh - Erpingham
Peter Reeves - Riley
Angela Pleasence - Eileen
Faith Kent - Lou
Charles Rea - Ted
John Forgeham - Kenny
Peter Honri - W. E. Harrison
Avril Fane - Jessie Mason
Peter Evans - Padre

Royal Court cast
Bernard Gallagher - Erpingham
Roddy Maude Roxby - Riley
Pauline Collins - Lou
Johnny Wade - Ted
Yvonne Antrobus - Eileen
Michael Standing - Kenny
Roger Booth - Padre
Ken Wynne - W.E. Harrison
Josie Bradley - Jessie Mason
Andre Evans - Redcoats and Campers
Rosemary McHale  -   "    "
Peter John  -   "    "
Malcolm Reid  -   "   "

References

External links
Joe Orton Online

1966 plays
Plays by Joe Orton
Works based on The Bacchae
Black comedy plays
British television plays
Plays based on works by Euripides
Modern adaptations of works by Euripides